Green Township is an inactive township in Lawrence County, in the U.S. state of Missouri.

Green Township was named for a verdant prairie within its borders.

References

Townships in Missouri
Townships in Lawrence County, Missouri